is a passenger railway station located in the city of Fujisawa, Kanagawa, Japan and operated by the private railway operator Odakyu Electric Railway.

Lines

Station layout
Hon-Kugenuma Station has two side platforms serving two tracks, which are connected to the station building by a footbridge.

Platforms

History
Hon-Kugenuma Station was opened on April 1, 1929. The platforms were lengthened to accept 10-car express trains in 1998.

Passenger statistics
In fiscal 2019, the station was used by an average of 13,938 passengers daily.

The passenger figures for previous years are as shown below.

Surrounding area
Shonan Gakuen Junior and Senior High School
Kugenuma Junior High School
Kugenuma Elementary School
Koyo Elementary School

See also
 List of railway stations in Japan

References

External links

  

Railway stations in Kanagawa Prefecture
Railway stations in Japan opened in 1929
Odakyū Enoshima Line
Railway stations in Fujisawa, Kanagawa